Gowran was a constituency represented in the Irish House of Commons until 1800.

History
In the Patriot Parliament of 1689 summoned by James II, Gowran was represented with two members.

Members of Parliament, 1609–1801
1613–1615 John Swayne and Thomas Stanton
1634–1635 John Hackett and James Kealy
1639–1649 Sir Patrick Wemyss and Peter Butler (Butler resigned and replaced 1641 by Piers Crosbie)
1661–1666 William Warden of Burnchurch and John Powell

1689–1801

Notes

References

Bibliography

Constituencies of the Parliament of Ireland (pre-1801)
Historic constituencies in County Kilkenny
1609 establishments in Ireland
1800 disestablishments in Ireland
Constituencies established in 1609
Constituencies disestablished in 1800